Torredonjimeno Club de Fútbol was a Spanish football team based in Torredonjimeno, in the autonomous community of Andalusia. Founded in 1940 and dissolved in 2009, it held home games at Estadio Matías Prats, which held 4,500 spectators.

History
Torredonjimeno was founded in 1940, first reaching the national categories (Tercera División) 58 years later, and remaining in the category for four seasons. In 2001–02 it promoted for the first time ever to Segunda División B, being immediately relegated back.

At the end of 2007–08, after ranking 20th and last in its group, Torredonjimeno returned to Primera Andaluza. In January 2009, after failing to report to two consecutive games, the team was disqualified from the competition and folded. Subsequently, a new team called UD Ciudad de Torredonjimeno was founded as the club's replacement.

Season to season

1 season in Segunda División B
9 seasons in Tercera División

References

Famous players
 Rui Mendes
 Selim Kaabi
 Darío Delgado
 Iván Fassione
 Sofian Allali
 Touré Moumine
 Aboubacar Sankharé
 Sergejs Misins
 Freddy Clément
 Ahmadou N'Diaye
 Mohamed Talibe
 Daniel Olsson
 Mehdi Tagawa

External links
Official website 

Association football clubs established in 1940
Association football clubs disestablished in 2009
Defunct football clubs in Andalusia
1940 establishments in Spain
2009 disestablishments in Spain